

History

The Sgt. William H. Carney House is a historic house at 128 Mill Street in New Bedford, Massachusetts.  The house was built in 1856, and is a -story wood-frame structure with Greek Revival styling.  It has a three-bay front facade, with the entrance in the left bay, sheltered by a hip-roofed bracketed hood.  It is notable as the home of William Harvey Carney, an enlistee in the African-American 54th Massachusetts Volunteer Infantry.  Carney distinguished himself at the Battle of Fort Wagner, actions for which he was belatedly awarded the Medal of Honor.

The house was listed on the National Register of Historic Places in 1975.

See also
National Register of Historic Places listings in New Bedford, Massachusetts

References

Houses in Bristol County, Massachusetts
Buildings and structures in New Bedford, Massachusetts
National Register of Historic Places in New Bedford, Massachusetts
Houses on the National Register of Historic Places in Bristol County, Massachusetts